András Mészáros may be:
 András Mészáros (cyclist)
 András Mészáros (footballer)